Sir Hersch Lauterpacht  (16 August 1897 – 8 May 1960) was a British international lawyer, human rights activist, and judge at the International Court of Justice.

Biography 
Hersh Lauterpacht was born on 16 August 1897 to a Jewish family in the small town of Żółkiew, in the Austro-Hungarian Empire, near Lemberg (now Lviv), the capital of East Galicia. In 1911 his family moved to Lemberg. In 1915 he enrolled in the law school of the University of Lemberg; it is not clear whether he graduated. Lauterpacht himself later wrote that he had not been able to take the final examinations "because the university has been closed to Jews in Eastern Galicia". He then moved to Vienna, and then London, where he became an international lawyer. He obtained a PhD degree from the London School of Economics in 1925, writing his dissertation on "Private law analogies in international law", which was published in 1927. 

By 1937 he had written several books on international law. He assisted in the prosecution of the defendants at the Nuremberg trials - helping to draft the British prosecutor's (Hartley Shawcross) speech. Lauterpacht was a member of the United Nations' International Law Commission from 1952 to 1954 and a Judge of the International Court of Justice from 1955 to 1960. In the words of former ICJ President Stephen M. Schwebel, Judge Sir Hersch Lauterpacht's "attainments are unsurpassed by any international lawyer of this century [...] he taught and wrote with unmatched distinction". Hersch's writings and (concurring and dissenting) opinions continue, nearly 50 years after his death, to be cited frequently in briefs, judgments, and advisory opinions of the World Court. He famously said "international law is at the vanishing point of law".

The Lauterpacht Centre for International Law at the University of Cambridge is named after him and his son, Sir Elihu Lauterpacht, CBE, QC, who founded the Centre and was its first director; Elihu remained actively involved in its work as Director Emeritus and Honorary Professor of International Law until his death in February 2017.

Samuel Moyn has suggested that Hersch was one of the few international lawyers actively campaigning for human rights in the late 1940s, and that he had "denounced the Universal Declaration as a shameful defeat of the ideals it grandly proclaimed". In the aftermath of the Holocaust Lauterpacht’s thinking also included the question how this unpreceded event could be properly met by an international law, which was based on established rules and precedents. When asked about the possibilities of the newly established state of Israel to claim citizenship for deceased Jewish victims of the Holocaust, Lauterpacht ambivalently stated that although this was not possible according to the present state of international law, it would only be an extraordinary reaction to an unprecedented event in history.

In 1948, Lauterpacht was asked by Yishuv diplomats to consider the legal basis for Israel's independence or write a declaration of independence for Israel. By May 1948, Lauterpacht had produced a two-part document that amounted to a declaration of independence. Some of Lauterpacht's draft was incorporated into what would ultimately become the ultimate draft of Israel’s Declaration of Independence.

Personal life 
He was married to Rachel Lauterpacht.

Major works 
 Private Law Sources and Analogies of International Law, London, 1927;
 The Function of Law in the International Community, Oxford, 1933;
 An International Bill of the Rights of Man, Oxford, 1945;
 Recognition in International Law, Cambridge, 1947;
 The Development of International Law by the International Court, London, 1958;
 Oppenheim's International Law, Vol. 1, 8th ed., 1958;
 Sir Gerald Fitzmaurice, Hersch Lauterpacht – The Scholar as Judge, Part I. 37 British Yearbook of International Law 1-72, 1961; Part II, 38 British Yearbook of International Law 1-84, 1962; Part III, 39 British Yearbook of International Law 133-189, 1963
 Annual Digest and Reports of Public International Law Cases, Vols. 1–16, subsequently continued as International Law Reports, Vols. 17–24
 International Law – The Collected Papers of Hersch Lauterpacht, Vol.5, Edited by Elihu Lauterpacht (Cambridge 2004) as reviewed by H.E. Former ICJ President Stephen M. Schwebel, in 99 American Journal of International Law 726-729 (2005)
 The Life of Hersch Lauterpacht (Cambridge November 2010) by Elihu Lauterpacht and ILR Announcement as reviewed by H.E. Former ICJ President Schwebel

See also 
 Whewell Professorship of International Law

References

Further reading 

 Marrus, Michael R. "Three Roads From Nuremberg", Tablet magazine; 20 Nov. 2015.
 Christopher R. Browning, "The Two Different Ways of Looking at Nazi Murder" (review of Philippe Sands, East West Street:  On the Origins of "Genocide" and "Crimes Against Humanity", Knopf, 425 pp., $32.50; and Christian Gerlach, The Extermination of the European Jews, Cambridge University Press, 508 pp., $29.99 [paper]), The New York Review of Books, vol. LXIII, no. 18 (24 November 2016), pp. 56–58.  Discusses Hersch Lauterpacht's legal concept of "crimes against humanity", contrasted with Rafael Lemkin's legal concept of "genocide".  All genocides are crimes against humanity, but not all crimes against humanity are genocides; genocides require a higher standard of proof, as they entail intent to destroy a particular group.
 Sands, Philippe, East West Street, Weidenfeld & Nicolson, 2016

External links 
 Sir Hersch Lauterpacht 1897–1960 and Lauterpacht Centre's Sitemap
 25th Lauterpacht Centre Anniversary, Cambridge, 11–12 July 2008 and Dinner Speeches of Former ICJ President Stephen M. Schwebel, current President Rosalyn Higgins and Sir Elihu Lauterpacht, CBE QC
 Squire Law Library of Eminent Sir Elihu Lauterpacht, CBE QC and Conversations with Sir Elihu and His Family Photographs
 Sir Hersch Lauterpacht, 8 EJIL 1997 No.2
 H.E. Former ICJ President Stephen M. Schwebel's Memories about Sir Hersch and 8 EJIL 1997 No.2
 Tributes from Hans Kelsen and Lord McNair to Sir Hersch Lauterpacht
 The Theorist as Judge: Hersch Lauterpacht's Concept of the International Judicial Function
 Human Rights and Genocide: The Work of Lauterpacht and Lemkin in Modern International Law
 Shabtai Rosenne, Sir Hersch Lauterpacht's Concept, in Rosenne, An International Law Miscellany, 782–829, 1993
 Sir Elihu Lauterpacht, CBE QC and Who's Who in Public International Law 2007
 TDM Co-Editor Lauterpacht
 The Lauterpacht Centre
 Hersch Lauterpacht Memorial Lectures
 
 
 
The Papers of Sir Hersch Lauterpacht held at Churchill Archives Centre

1897 births
1960 deaths
People from Zhovkva
Ukrainian Jews
20th-century English judges
International law scholars
International Court of Justice judges
International Law Commission officials
Members of Gray's Inn
Members of the Institut de Droit International
Jews from Galicia (Eastern Europe)
Austrian emigrants to England
Whewell Professors of International Law
Naturalised citizens of the United Kingdom
20th-century King's Counsel
Austrian Jews
British judges of United Nations courts and tribunals
Ukrainian-Jewish emigrants to the United Kingdom
Members of the International Law Commission